Audrey Olatokunbo Ajose (born c. 1937) is a Nigerian lawyer and writer. She served as her country's ambassador to Scandinavia from 1987 to 1991.

Early life and education 
The daughter of Omoba Oladele Ajose and Beatrice Spencer Roberts. Audrey Ajose was the daughter of a foreign woman married to a Nigerian. She studied journalism at the  Regent Polytechnic. She studied and practiced law but still continued to work in broadcasting. She also studied theology and taught theology in the Lutheran church.

Career 
Ajose worked as a journalist at the Daily Times of Nigeria. Barrister Ajose made the case for more flexible immigration laws for foreign women married to Nigerians to some of the country's top parliamentarians. She drafted the first Nigerwives-Nigeria constitution under the Corporate Affairs Commission of Nigeria on 7th September 1987 with an RC No. 5527.   

Ajose was a founding member of Soroptimist International of Eko and served as its president. She was a member of the Isale Eko Descendants’ Union Scholarship Fund Committee (89).

Selected works 
 Yomi's Adventures, juvenile fiction (1964)
 Yomi in Paris, juvenile fiction (1966)

References 

1930s births
Living people
Nigerian women journalists
Nigerian children's writers
Nigerian women children's writers
Ambassadors of Nigeria to Sweden
Place of birth missing (living people)
Nigerian women lawyers
Ambassadors of Nigeria to Norway
Ambassadors of Nigeria to Denmark
Nigerian women diplomats
Nigerian women ambassadors
Yoruba people
Yoruba women writers
Yoruba legal professionals
Yoruba children's writers
Alumni of the Regent Street Polytechnic